Lloyd Stephenson (born 10 May 1981 in Thames Valley) is a field hockey player from New Zealand, who earned his first cap for the national team, nicknamed The Black Sticks, in April 2001. Originally from Thames Valley, the striker/midfielder was based in Perth for 2005, but played in New Zealand most recently for North Harbour. He helped New Zealand qualify for the 2004 Summer Olympics in Athens as a member of the Olympic qualifying team, but experienced striker Bevan Hari was selected for the final squad. He returned to the team for a home series against Malaysia, and toured Europe in July 2005. After 102 caps for the national team he retired in 2009.

International senior tournaments 
 2003 – Sultan Azlan Shah Cup, Kuala Lumpur
 2004 – Olympic Qualifying Tournament, Madrid
 2004 – Champions Trophy
 2006 – World Cup

References 

New Zealand male field hockey players
1981 births
Living people
Male field hockey forwards
Male field hockey midfielders
2006 Men's Hockey World Cup players
World Series Hockey players